Khadijah Rushdan (born December 5, 1988) is a professional basketball player who played in the 2012 WNBA preseason. In 2012, she strained her groin, which caused her to miss the 2012 WNBA season.

College
Rushan was a first team All-Big East selection her last year at Rutgers. Rushdan led the Big East her junior year in Assist to Turnover Ratio. She is one of two players in Rutgers women's basketball history to record a triple-double. Rushdan is only one of two players in history to accumulate over 1,000 points, 500 rebounds and 400 assists.

Rutgers  statistics
Source

References

External links
2012 NCAA tournament – Rutgers standout senior Khadijah Rushdan has will to succeed- ESPN

1988 births
Living people
American women's basketball players
Basketball players from Wilmington, Delaware
Guards (basketball)
Los Angeles Sparks draft picks
Rutgers Scarlet Knights women's basketball players